Angeekaaram is a 1977 Indian Malayalam-language film, directed by I. V. Sasi and produced by Ramachandran. The film stars Prameela, Sridevi, Vincent, Sukumaran, K. P. Ummer and Prathapachandran. The film has musical score by A. T. Ummer. It is the first film to feature Sridevi in dual roles.

Plot

Cast 

Prameela as Maalini
Sridevi as Sathi and Viji
Vincent as Vijayan
Prathapachandran as Shekhara Pillai
Sukumaran as Ravi
Bahadoor as Gangadharan
K. P. Ummer as Madhavan Thambi
Kuthiravattam Pappu as Neelaambaran
Meena as Devaki Teacher
Ravikumar as Prasad

Soundtrack 
The music is composed by A. T. Ummer.

References

Bibliography

External links 
 

1970s Malayalam-language films
1977 films
Films directed by I. V. Sasi